2nd Independent Division of Guangdong Provincial Military District() was formed in August 1966 from 1st, 2nd and 8th Regiment of the Public Security Contingent of Guangdong province. The division was composed of three regiments (4th to 6th). The division was then stationed in Guangzhou, Guangdong.

In March 1969 it moved to Changsha, Hunan and temporarily renamed as Independent Division of Guangzhou Military Region in Hunan().

On February 15, 1970, the division was renamed as Independent Division of Hunan Provincial Military District(). All its regiments were renamed as follows:
1st Infantry Regiment (former 4th);
2nd Infantry Regiment (former 5th);
3rd Infantry Regiment (former 6th).

In January 1977 the division was disbanded.

References

Infantry divisions of the People's Liberation Army
Military units and formations established in 1966
Military units and formations disestablished in 1977